Tago Island is a mountain, which is also the eponymous whole island, in northeastern Iloilo, Philippines. It is part of the municipality of Concepcion.

Location and geography
Mount Tago, covering the whole Tago Island, is east of Panay Island in the Visayan Sea. Tago and Pan de Azucar are separated by the impassable Pan Pass.

See also 

 List of islands in the Philippines

References

External links
 Tago Island at OpenStreetMap

Islands of Iloilo